Areca andersonii is a species of flowering plant in the family Arecaceae. It is a tree endemic to Borneo. It is threatened by habitat loss.

References

andersonii
Endemic flora of Borneo
Trees of Borneo
Plants described in 1984
Data deficient plants
Taxonomy articles created by Polbot
Taxa named by John Dransfield